Elections to Brisbane City Council were held on Saturday, 19 March 2016 to elect a councillor to each of the local government area's 26 wards and the direct election of the Lord Mayor of Brisbane.

The election resulted in the comprehensive re-election of the Liberal National Party under Graham Quirk as Lord Mayor. The Liberal National's increased their representation by one ward to a total of 19 of 26. The lord mayoral result of 59.3% of the two-party-preferred vote was reduced for Quirk from the 69.5% result at the previous election. The main opposition party, the Labor Party was reduced to just 5 wards; its worst result in over a decade. The Queensland Greens won their first ward in this election.

Results

Mayoral election

Ward elections

Disproportionality

References

2016 elections in Australia
2016
March 2016 events in Australia
2010s in Brisbane